Dallas Jackson (born November 20, 1993) is an American football defensive back for the Jacksonville Sharks of the National Arena League (NAL). He played college football at Jacksonville University and attended Palmetto High School in Palmetto, Florida. He has been a member of the Tampa Bay Storm, Florida Tarpons and Washington Valor.

Early life
Jackson attended Palmetto High School where he played American football, basketball and track and field.

College career
Jackson played for the Jacksonville Dolphins from 2012 to 2015. He was the team's starter his final two years and helped the Dolphins to 30 wins. He played in 41 games during his career including 24 starts at safety.

Professional career

Jackson was assigned to the Tampa Bay Storm on August 5, 2016, but did not appear in a game. On January 5, 2017, the Storm exercised their rookie option on Jackson. Jackson made his debut on April 15, 2017 against the Philadelphia Soul. On June 2, 2017, Jackson was placed on reassignment. On June 29, 2017, Jackson was assigned to the Storm. The Storm folded in December 2017.

Jackson signed with the Florida Tarpons of the American Arena League on January 20, 2018.

On March 23, 2018, he was assigned to the Washington Valor. On April 10, 2018, he was placed on reassignment.

On April 19, 2018, Jackson signed with the Jacksonville Sharks.

References

External links
 Jacksonville Dolphins bio

Living people
1983 births
Players of American football from Florida
People from Palmetto, Florida
American football defensive backs
Jacksonville Dolphins football players
Tampa Bay Storm players
Florida Tarpons players
Washington Valor players
Jacksonville Sharks players